John E. Gallagher was a Democratic member of the Wisconsin State Assembly during the 1850 session. Gallagher represented Waukesha County, Wisconsin.

References

People from Waukesha County, Wisconsin
19th-century American politicians
Year of birth missing
Year of death missing
Democratic Party members of the Wisconsin State Assembly